"Early Morning" is a song by Norwegian band A-ha, which was released in 1991 as the third single from their fourth studio album, East of the Sun, West of the Moon (1990). It was written by Paul Waaktaar-Savoy and Magne Furuholmen, and produced by Ian Stanley. "Early Morning" reached number 78 in the United Kingdom and number 29 in Ireland. A music video was filmed to promote the single, directed by Michael Burlingame, while the video's black-and-white footage was directed by Lauren Savoy.

Recalling the song in 2015, Furuholmen revealed the song references the Doors, which had been "childhood heroes" to the band.

Critical reception
On its release as a single, Music & Media wrote, "The band continue their brand of easy recognisable pop tunes which EHR programmers will welcome with open arms." Julian Cope of New Musical Express picked "Early Morning" as one of the magazine's "single[s] of the week" and commented that it "could be from the second Doors album". In a retrospective review of East of the Sun, West of the Moon, Sassan Niasseri of Rolling Stone said the song "tells of murder and suicide, backed by a psychedelic-sounding bass drumming a la The Doors." Paul Sinclair of Super Deluxe Edition described it as "wistful adult pop".

Track listings

CD single
"Early Morning" – 2:59
"East of the Sun" – 4:47
"Train of Thought" – 4:11

7-inch single
"Early Morning" – 2:59
"East of the Sun" – 4:47

12-inch single
"Early Morning" – 2:59
"East of the Sun" – 4:47
"Train of Thought" – 4:11

Cassette single
"Early Morning" – 2:59
"East of the Sun" – 4:47

Personnel

A-ha
 Morten Harket – vocals
 Paul Waaktaar-Savoy – guitars
 Magne Furuholmen – keyboards

Additional musicians
 Jørun Bøgeberg – bass guitar
 Per Hillestad – drums

Production
 Ian Stanley – producer
 Nick Davis – recording, mixing

Other
 Knut Bry – photography
 Bill Smith Studio – design

Charts

References

1990 songs
1991 singles
A-ha songs
Songs written by Magne Furuholmen
Songs written by Paul Waaktaar-Savoy
Song recordings produced by Ian Stanley
Warner Records singles